Faon is a village in the Loumana Department of Léraba Province in western Burkina Faso. As of 2003, the village had a population of 384.

References

Populated places in the Cascades Region
Léraba Province